Ester-Anna-Liisa Shiwomwenyo Nghipondoka (born 13 June 1957) is a Namibian politician and member of SWAPO. She was appointed the Minister of Education, Arts and Culture in March 2020 after having worked as deputy minister with the same portfolio since 2015.In 2021 under her ministry they have implemented a new education curriculum called Advanced Subsidiary(AS). She further stated in  2022 that the new curriculum is not a bad. Nghipondoka also encouraged the teachers to embrace the new curriculum despise the challenges it has.

Early life and education
Nghipondoka was born on 13 June 1957 in a village called Ohakweenyanga, near Ongwediva in Ovamboland (today Oshana Region). Nghipondoka was educated under the Bantu Education Act, becoming one of a few qualified black students who could go on to non-white universities, teacher or technical training institutions in the Republic of South Africa, as there were no universities in Namibia. 

She obtained a Masters of Education (specialising in inclusive education) from the University of the Western Cape, a Bachelor of Education (specialising in special education needs), a Bachelor of Arts  in psychology from the University of Fort Hare, and a Junior Secondary Teacher Certificate.

Career
Prior to entering politics, Nghipondoka was a teacher, school principal and director of education for  Oshikoto Region and thereafter Omusati Region followed by a stint as acting CEO for the Namibia Training Authority (2013-2014).

Education minister Anna Nghipondoka became a member of the National Assembly in 2015 and was appointed as the deputy Minister of Education, Arts and Culture. In 2020 she was promoted to minister by president Hage Geingob.

Qualifications 
Anna Nghipondoka has Masters of Education, where she specialised in inclusive education, a Bachelor of education [specialised in special education needs], the Bachelor of Arts in which her major is Psychology as well as the Junior Secondary Teacher Certificate.

References

1957 births
Living people
People from Oshana Region
SWAPO politicians
Namibian educators
21st-century Namibian women politicians
21st-century Namibian politicians
Education ministers of Namibia
Women government ministers of Namibia
Women members of the National Assembly (Namibia)
Members of the National Assembly (Namibia)
University of Fort Hare alumni
University of the Western Cape alumni